Lomovka is a rural locality (a selo) in Lomovsky Selsoviet of Beloretsky District of the Republic of Bashkortostan, Russia. Population:

Geography 
It is located 5 km from Beloretsk.

References 

Rural localities in Beloretsky District